Domain privacy (often called Whois privacy) is a service offered by a number of domain name registrars. A user buys privacy from the company, who in turn replaces the user's information in the WHOIS with the information of a forwarding service (for email and sometimes postal mail, it is done by a proxy server).

Level of anonymity
Registrars typically collect personal information to provide the service. Some registrars take little persuasion to release the so-called 'private' information to the world, requiring only a phone request or a cease and desist letter. Others, however, handle privacy with more precaution, using measures including hosting domain names offshore and accepting cryptocurrencies for payment so that the registrar has no knowledge of the domain name owner's personal information (which would otherwise be transmitted with credit card transactions). It is debatable whether or not this practice is at odds with the domain registration requirement of the Internet Corporation for Assigned Names and Numbers (ICANN).

Privacy by default
Some top-level domains have privacy caveats:
 .al: No information about the owner is disclosed.
 .at, .co.at, .or.at: Since May 21, 2010, contact data (defined as phone number, fax number, e-mail address) is hidden by the registrar and must be explicitly made public.
 .ca: Since June 10, 2008, the Canadian Internet Registration Authority no longer posts registration details of individuals associated with .ca domains.
.ch and .li  : Since 1st January 2021 Whois information is private by default and can be obtained only in limited cases
 .de: Since May 25, 2018, the German Internet Registration Authority denic put extensive changes into force for the Whois Lookup Service. With a few exceptions, third parties can no longer access domain ownership data.
 .eu: If the registrant is a natural person, only the e-mail address is shown in the public whois records unless specified otherwise.
 .fi: Individual persons' data is not published (changed in 2019), but for companies, associations, etc., data is published.
 .fr: By default, individual domain name holders benefit from the restricted publishing of their personal data in the AFNIC public Whois.
 .gr: No information about the owner is disclosed.
 .is: May hide address and phone number.
 .nl: Since January 12, 2010, registrant postal addresses are no longer publicly available.
 .ovh: Contact data is hidden by the registrar and must be explicitly made public.
 .uk: Nominet, the guardian of UK domain namespace, provide domain privacy tools on their extensions (.co.uk, .me.uk etc.), providing that the registrant is not trading from the domain name. While the home address of the registrant can be hidden, the full name cannot.
 .ro: No information about the owner is disclosed.

Privacy forbidden
 .us: In March 2005, the National Telecommunications and Information Administration (NTIA) said that owners of .us domains will not have the option of keeping their information private, and that it must be made public.
 .in: Registrants for Indian domain names may not use any proxy or privacy services provided by registrars.
 .it Italian domain names can not keep information private for law.
 .au Any Australian domain names ends with .au is forbidden from privacy due to the law. While most of the information are public, some of the information such as the street address, telephone and fax numbers of registrant is hidden.

Implications
The Internet Corporation for Assigned Names and Numbers (ICANN) broadly requires the mailing address, phone number, and e-mail address of those owning or administrating a domain name to be made publicly available through the "WHOIS" directories. However, that policy enables spammers, direct marketers, identity thieves, or other attackers to use the directory to acquire personal information about those people. Although ICANN has been working to change WHOIS to enable greater privacy, there is a lack of consensus among major stakeholders as to what type of change should be made. However, with the offer of private registration from many registrars, some of the risk has been mitigated.

Litigation
With the help of "private registration," the service can be the legal owner of the domain. This has occasionally resulted in legal problems.  Ownership of a domain name is given by the organization name of the owner contact in the domain's WHOIS record.  There are typically four contact positions in a domain's WHOIS record: owner, administrator, billing, and technical.  Some registrars will not shield the owner organization name in order to protect the ownership of the domain name.

There has been at least one lawsuit against Namecheap, Inc. for its role as owner/registrant; Namecheap lost its motion to dismiss. Silverstein v. Alivemax, et al. Los Angeles Superior Court Case Number BC480994 was dismissed in May of 2014. Silverstein is well known for his anti-spam and email privacy campaigns, most notably in the case of William Silverstein v Keynetics, Inc., No. 17-15176 (9th Cir. 2018), but this was decided for Keynetics in March 2018.

Ownership of domains held by a privacy service was also an issue in the RegisterFly case, in which a registrar effectively ceased operations and then went bankrupt.  Customers encountered serious difficulties in regaining control of the domains involved. ICANN has since remedied that situation by requiring all accredited registrars to maintain their customers' contact data in escrow.  In the event a registrar loses its accreditation, gTLD domains, along with the escrowed contact data, will be transferred to another accredited registrar.

See also
 Domain slamming
 Internet privacy
 Anonymity

References

External links

Privacy
Internet privacy